Blud of Bludov was the Moravian aristocrat who was ancestor of the House of Zierotin and the founder of the village of Bludov. His name appears in records around 1200 as a Grand Huntsman and from 1213 till 1215, as the burgrave of Přerov. He had two sons, Oneš (1209–1249) and Viktor.

References

Moravian nobility
Medieval Bohemian nobility